Cornelia Wilhelmina (Mineke) Bosch (born 1954) is a Dutch historian born in South Africa. She is Professor of Modern History at the University of Groningen in the Netherlands.

Early life
Mineke Bosch was born in Pretoria, South Africa on July 2, 1954. She studied history at the University of Groningen and then received her PhD (cum laude) from Erasmus University Rotterdam in 1994. It was titled The gender of science: women and higher education in the Netherlands 1878-1948.

Career
Mineke Bosch's research focuses on history of science, women's and gender history, international women's movements and (auto)biography. She is the author of a biography (An Unwavering Faith in Justice: Aletta Jacobs 1854-1929) of Aletta Jacobs, the first woman to attend a Dutch university officially and campaigner for women's suffrage. According to Bosch, "I think Aletta Jacobs would fully agree with the # MeToo movement - although of course I can't speak for her."

Bosch travelled to Moscow with Myriam Everard in 1994 in order to assess if any works from the International Archives for the Women's Movement could be recovered.

Between 1998 and 2007 Bosch was Associate Professor in the Centre for Gender and Diversity at the University of Maastricht. She was appointed to the centre's special chair in Gender and Science. Her inaugural lecture was entitled The burden of tradition: Gender and the culture of memory in science.

Bosch became Professor of Modern History at the University of Groningen in 2008.

Suffrage exhibition
To mark 100 years of universal suffrage in the Netherlands, Bosch and Egge Knol have organised an exhibition called Battle! 100 years of women's suffrage (Strijd! 100 jaar vrouwenkiesrecht) at the Groninger Museum.

Selected publications
Bosch, M. (2019 forthcoming) Strijd!: de vrouwenkiesrechtbeweging in woord en beeld, 1882-1922
Bosch, M. (2005) Een onwrikbaar geloof in rechtvaardigheid: Aletta Jacobs 1854-1929 Balans .
Bosch, M. & Kloosterman, A. (1985) Lieve Dr. Jacobs. Brieven uit de Wereldbond voor Vrouwenkiesrecht, 1902-1942 Feministische Uitgeverij Sara

References

External links 
 University webpage

20th-century Dutch historians
Dutch women historians
University of Groningen alumni
Academic staff of the University of Groningen
1954 births
Living people
People from Pretoria
21st-century Dutch historians